Adore Beauty is an Australian online cosmetics retailer. The company was founded in 1999 by Kate Morris and is based in the suburb of Northcote in Melbourne, Victoria.

History

The company was founded in 1999 by Kate Morris, a 21-year-old business student. Morris used savings and an A$12,000 loan from her boyfriend's parents to start the business, which she ran out of her garage. She found a company in the newspaper to build the first website, which cost A$8,000 and took six months.

At first, the company only stocked two small Australian brands: Baiame and Santalia. The first mainstream brand, Bloom, signed on in 2002. Clarins signed on in 2006.

The company had a $2 million turnover by the end of 2010. In 2014, the company secured a deal with Estee Lauder Companies to become an authorized agent for Clinique, Bobbi Brown and Estee Lauder brands. That same year, the company earned over $7 million in revenue and ranked 29th in the Smart Company ‘Smart50’ Awards. Morris won the Innovation Award for Victoria in the 2014 Telstra Women's Business Awards.

In 2015, Australian retailer Woolworths Limited bought a 25% stake in the company for an undisclosed sum. The investment grew the company 70% over one year. Morris remained the CEO.

In 2016, the company reported an annual turn over of $16 million, carrying 150 brands and 10,000 products. The company is an official online stockist of Dermalogica, ghd, Clarisonic, Lancôme, Benefit Cosmetics, Aesop and Kérastase. The company's Findation service, which compares 22,000 foundations to find the best match, had 1.5 million users, as of 2015.

In 2016, the company began expanding into China. In 2017, Morris bought back Woolworths' 25% stake in the business, restoring her stake to 100%.

In 2019, Morris sold 60% of Adore Beauty to Quadrant Private Equity. In 2020, the company listed on the Australian Stock Exchange.

References

External links
 Adore Beauty Australia official website
 Adore Beauty New Zealand official website  

Companies based in Melbourne
Cosmetics companies of Australia
Online retailers of Australia
Australian companies established in 1999
Companies listed on the Australian Securities Exchange